George Washington Jr. (August 1899 – December 27, 1966) served for a time as treasurer of the G. Washington Coffee Company started by his father, George Washington. He was also an inventor, patenting a photoengraving process for newspapers that was introduced by Fairchild Camera and Instrument in 1948.

Biography
He was born in August 1899 in New York City to George Washington. He attended the Polytechnic Preparatory Country Day School in Brooklyn, New York City and the Milford School. He served in the Army Signal Corps during World War I.

He married Marian Engel.

He served as treasurer of the G. Washington Coffee Company.

He was also an inventor. He patented a photoengraving process for newspapers that was introduced by Fairchild Camera and Instrument in 1948.

He died at Morristown Memorial Hospital in Morristown, New Jersey on December 27, 1966.

External links
George Washington, Jr. patents

References

American drink industry businesspeople
Businesspeople in coffee
People from Park Slope
1899 births
1966 deaths
Poly Prep alumni
Businesspeople from New York City
Military personnel from New York City
20th-century American businesspeople